Mark Simmons (born January 16, 1984) is a former American football wide receiver. He was signed by the San Diego Chargers as an undrafted free agent in 2006. He played college football at Kansas.

External links
Houston Texans bio
Kansas Jayhawks bio

1984 births
Living people
Sportspeople from Bloomington, Minnesota
American football wide receivers
Kansas Jayhawks football players
San Diego Chargers players
Houston Texans players